Johnnie Walker is a brand of whisky produced in Scotland.

Johnnie, Johnny, or Jonny Walker may also refer to:

People

Entertainment 
Johnnie Walker (actor) (1894–1949), American actor appeared in silent and sound films
Johnny Walker (actor) (1924–2003), Indian actor
Johnny "Big Moose" Walker (1927–1999), American electric blues pianist and organist
Johnnie Walker (DJ) (born 1945), British radio disc jockey
Johnny Walker (DJ) (1948–2004), America radio disc jockey, real name James Embry
Johnny Walker, rock musician in the Soledad Brothers

Military
Frederic John Walker (1896–1944), nicknamed "Johnnie" after the whisky, British Royal Navy officer during the Second World War
John Anthony Walker (1937–2014), former US Navy Warrant Officer convicted of spying for the Soviets

Sports 
Johnny Walker (fighter) (born 1992), Brazilian MMA Fighter
Jonny Walker (boxer) (1819–1888), English bare-knuckle boxer
Johnny Walker (baseball) (1896–1976), American baseball infielder
Johnny Walker (Australian footballer) (1908–1980), Australian rules footballer
Johnny Walker (footballer, born 1928) (1928–2019), Scottish professional footballer who played for Wolverhampton Wanderers, Southampton and Reading
John "Johnny" Walker (born 1934), American professional wrestler better known as Mr. Wrestling II
Johnny Walker (footballer, born 1973), Scottish professional footballer who played for Clydebank, Grimsby, Mansfield and Hamilton Academical
Jonny Walker (soccer) (born 1974), American soccer goalkeeper
Johnnie Walker (cyclist) (born 1987), Australian cyclist
Jonny Walker (rugby league, born 1988), English rugby league footballer
Jonny Walker (motorcyclist) (born 1991), English motorcycle rider
Johnnie Walker (racing driver), Australian racing driver

Other people
John Walker (grocer) (1805–1857), known as Johnnie, Scottish grocer and originator of Johnnie Walker Scotch
E. S. Johnny Walker (1911–2000), U.S. Representative from New Mexico

Other uses
Johnnie Walker, a fictional character in the novel Kafka on the Shore (2002) by Haruki Murakami
Johnny Walker, the character played by Mickey Rourke in the film Homeboy (1988)
Johnnie Walker (film), Malayalam film starring Mammooty
Johnny Walker (bomb), a Second World War anti-shipping "hunting" bomb

See also
John Walker (disambiguation)
Jonathan Walker (disambiguation)

Walker, Johnnie